MTV Denmark was a music and entertainment channel broadcasting to the Danish market.

The channel replaced MTV Nordic in May, 2005, however on February 22, 2019, it was replaced by the return of MTV Nordic.

History
The channel started in May 2005 as part of MTV's expansion into the Nordic region, which followed with launches of MTV Finland, MTV Sweden, and MTV Norway in September 2005. Before the start of country-specific channels, Denmark, Sweden, Norway, and Finland had been served by a common channel called MTV Nordic, launched on 5 June 1998 to replace the MTV Europe feed.
The channel was broadcast from the MTV Networks Europe headquarters in London, along with other MTV channels i.e. MTV Sweden. As of 2011, MTV Denmark is broadcast from its operations in Stockholm.
On February 22, 2019, the local MTV channels for the Nordic region were replaced by the relaunch of MTV Nordic which features no advertising or sponsorships. Despite this, separate websites still exist for the local languages.

Availability
MTV Denmark was available from virtually all major television distributors in Denmark. Most cable networks carry the channel in their basic packages.
It also had a radio network called MTV Radio that launched on November 1, 2019, and was available online, in DAB+ and on 98.6 MHz in Zealand. It got replaced by ENERGY at early 2021.

Former local shows
During the days of MTV Nordic, languages other than English were rarely spoken on MTV in Denmark. With the start of MTV Denmark, several Danish language programmes were produced. These include:
MTV News
Fusion Chart, a daily top 10 chart
Spanking New
Headbangers Ball
Transistor (Daily Live Request Show)

Former presenters (VJs)
 Christine Roloff
 Freya Christine Clausen

References

External links
Official site

MTV channels
Television stations in Denmark
Television channels and stations established in 2005
Music organizations based in Denmark